Anđelo Kvesić (born 8 June 1995) is a Croatian karateka. He won the gold medal in the men's kumite +84 kg event at the 2022 European Karate Championships held in Gaziantep, Turkey. He won the silver medal in the men's kumite +84 kg event at the 2019 European Games held in Minsk, Belarus.

Career 

In 2017, he competed in the men's kumite +84 kg event at the World Games held in Wrocław, Poland. He was eliminated in the elimination round.

In 2021, he won one of the bronze medals in the men's +84 kg event at the World Karate Championships held in Dubai, United Arab Emirates.

He won the gold medal in the men's +84 kg event at the 2022 Mediterranean Games held in Oran, Algeria. In the final, he defeated Hocine Daikhi of Algeria. He won the silver medal in the men's kumite +84 kg event at the 2022 World Games held in Birmingham, United States.

Personal life 

His brother Ivan Kvesić also competes in karate.

Achievements

References

External links 
 

Living people
1995 births
Place of birth missing (living people)
Croatian male karateka
Competitors at the 2017 World Games
European Games silver medalists for Croatia
Karateka at the 2019 European Games
European Games medalists in karate
Competitors at the 2022 Mediterranean Games
Mediterranean Games gold medalists for Croatia
Mediterranean Games medalists in karate
Competitors at the 2022 World Games
World Games medalists in karate
World Games silver medalists
21st-century Croatian people